Kyra is a rural locality (a selo) and the administrative center of Kyrinsky District of Zabaykalsky Krai, Russia. Population:

Geography
The village is located in the area of the Khentei-Daur Highlands on the left bank of the Kyra River, near the Russian-Mongolian border.

Transportation
A local road to the north through the selo of Mordoy connects Kyra to the regional road A167, which leads to the border with Mongolia to the south and Aksha, Duldurga, and Darasun to the north. Local roads also connect to the rural localities of Gavan and Bilyutuy.

Climate
Kyra has a borderline subarctic/humid continental climate (Köppen climate classification Dwc/Dwb) with very dry, severely cold winters and warm, wet summers.

References

Rural localities in Zabaykalsky Krai